Niklas Blomqvist (born 8 February 1996) is a Finnish professional footballer who plays for KaaPo, as a midfielder.

References

1996 births
Living people
Finnish footballers
Turun Palloseura footballers
Åbo IFK players
Kaarinan Pojat players
Veikkausliiga players
Ykkönen players
Kakkonen players
Association football midfielders